This is a listing of Australian television presenters and television journalists.

Nine Network 

 Amelia Adams
 Tara Brown
 Scott Cam
 David Campbell
 Shelley Craft
 Alex Cullen
 Ben Fordham
 Georgie Gardner
 Tracy Grimshaw 
 Jo Hall
 Peter Hitchener
 Tony Jones
 Wendy Kingston
 Deborah Knight
 Alicia Loxley
 Eddie McGuire
 Leila McKinnon
 Brett McLeod
 Livinia Nixon
 Peter Overton
 Bruce Paige
 Amber Sherlock
 Karl Stefanovic
 Richard Wilkins

Seven Network 

 Angie Asimus
 Samantha Armytage
 Mike Amor
 Natalie Barr
 Mark Beretta
 Sally Bowrey
 Angela Cox
 Matt Doran
 Larry Emdur
 Kylie Gillies
 David Koch
 Rebecca Maddern
 Peter Mitchell
 Ann Sanders
 Matt Shirvington
 James Tobin
 Tim Watson
 Monique Wright
 Michael Usher

Network 10 

 Waleed Aly
 Angela Bishop
 Peter Helliar
 Grant Denyer
 Osher Günsberg
 Sarah Harris
 Narelda Jacobs
 Amanda Keller
 Jennifer Keyte
 Hamish Macdonald
 Stephen Quartermain
 Hugh Riminton
 Sandra Sully
 Lisa Wilkinson
 Chris Bath

ABC 
 Shaun Micallef
 Michael Rowland
 Juanita Phillips
 Leigh Sales
 Lisa Millar
 Joe O'Brien
 Ros Childs
 Johanna Nicholson
 Fauziah Ibrahim
 Miriam Corowa
 Karina Carvalho
 Beverley O'Connor
 Briana Shepherd

SBS 
 Jenny Brockie
 Anton Enus
 Craig Foster
 Janice Petersen
 Mike Tomalaris

Past presenters 
 Alo Baker (Seven Network)
 James Bradshaw (Nine Network)
 Heather Foord (Nine Network)
 Peter Harvey (Nine Network) (died 2013)
 Garry Lyon (Nine Network)
 Dixie Marshall (Nine Network)
 Bert Newton (Nine Network and Network Ten) (died 2021)
 Mike Goldman (Nine and Ten Networks)
 Greg Pearce (Nine Network and Network Ten) (retired)
 Ian Ross (Nine Network and Seven Network) (died 2014)
 Mal Walden (Network Ten)
 Lee Lin Chin (SBS)
 Les Murray (SBS) (died 2017)

See also
 List of Australian television series

Television presenters

Television presenters
Australia
Australian television presenters